Moose was a steamboat that operated on the Willamette River from late 1859 to 1861.

Construction
Moose was completed by Smith, Pease & Company by October 8, 1859.  Another source states that Moose was built at Canemah in 1859 for Smith, Moore, Marshall & Co.

Moose was a light-draft boat built for service on the upper Willamette River.  Moose was 75 feet long, probably exclusive of the extension of the main deck over the stern, called the fantail, on which the stern-wheel was mounted.  Moose had a beam (width) of 16 feet and a depth of hold of 4 feet.

Moose was driven by twin single-cylinder steam engines each with a cylinder bore of 12 inches and a piston stroke of 48 inches.  The engines generated 9.6 nominal horsepower.

Operations
Moose made its trial trip on October 4, 1859.  The owners planned to take Moose to Eugene City if the water level permitted.

Disposition
Moose was wrecked in 1861 at Peoria, Oregon.

Notes

References

Printed books

On-line newspaper collections

 

Steamboats of the Willamette River
Ships built in Canemah, Oregon